Judah's revolts against Babylon (601–586 BCE) were attempts by the Kingdom of Judah to escape dominance by the Neo-Babylonian Empire. Resulting in a Babylonian victory and the destruction of the Kingdom of Judah, it marked the beginning of the prolonged hiatus in Jewish self-rule in Judaea until the Maccabean Revolt of the 2nd century BCE. Babylonian forces captured the capital city of Jerusalem and destroyed Solomon's Temple, completing the fall of Judah, an event which marked the beginning of the Babylonian captivity, a period in Jewish history in which a large number of Judeans were forcibly removed from Judah and resettled in Mesopotamia (rendered in the Bible simply as "Babylon").

Background
Egypt was the regional power until the Battle of Charchamesh around 606 BCE. Later, Babylonia came and ended the Egyptian rule, established its own dominance, and made Judah its vassal.

First revolt
According to the Hebrew Bible, for three years, Judah paid taxes to Babylonia, until King Jehoiakim decided to stop the payments and went to war with Babylonia. Unfortunately for Judah, Moab, Ammon and Chaldea went to war against it alongside Babylonia.

First siege of Jerusalem

Nebuchadnezzar besieged Jerusalem in 597 BCE, and managed to capture the city and King Jehoiachin, along with all of the aristocracy of Jerusalem. He then looted the treasures of the temple, including the golden implements. Nebuchadnezzar exiled 10,000 of the officers, the craftsmen, and 7,000 soldiers, after which he appointed Jehoiachin's uncle, Mattaniah, as king of Judah. Later, Mattaniah changed his name to Zedekiah.

Second revolt

In July 587 BCE, Zedekiah rebelled against Babylonia, making an alliance with Egypt, and Nebuchadnezzar besieged Jerusalem again, starving the people. Later, the Babylonian troops managed to get inside the walls and conquer the city, yet Zedekiah and some of his troops managed to escape to Jericho, where they fought against the Babylonians (called Chaldeans by the Bible), who captured Zedekiah and his sons and brought them in chains to Babylonia, where Zedekiah's children were executed in front of him.

On the seventh of Av, Nebuzaradan, captain of Nebuchadnezzar's body guard, burned down Solomon's Temple, destroyed the walls of Jerusalem, and exiled the rest of the Jews to Babylonia. He appointed Gedalia as the administrator of the Jews that weren't exiled from Judah. Judah ceased to exist a year later, in 586 BCE. Gedalia was murdered in 582 BCE.

See also
List of conflicts in the Near East

Bibliography
Hebrew Bible: 2 Kings 24–25, Book of Jeremiah, Book of Ezekiel, 2 Chronicles 36
Nebuchadnezzar Chronicle

References

7th century BC in the Kingdom of Judah
6th century BC in the Kingdom of Judah
7th-century BC conflicts
6th-century BC conflicts
Hebrew Bible battles
Nebuchadnezzar II
Revolts
Wars involving the states and peoples of Asia